Reeves Corner tram stop is a stop on the Tramlink service in central Croydon.
It is normally only served by trams travelling eastbound from Wimbledon to Croydon; trams going in the opposite direction pass the station on the other side of the road without stopping. The complementary stop for westbound trams is Church Street tram stop.

, redevelopment was taking place. Arcadia House, which adjoined the platform, had been demolished and was being replaced by a new high-rise structure known as 'Cairo'.

The name is derived from House of Reeves, a furniture store established in 1867, one of whose buildings was destroyed in the 2011 England riots.

Connections
London Buses routes 157; 264; 407; 410; and 455 serve the tram stop.

Gallery

References 

Tramlink stops in the London Borough of Croydon
Railway stations in Great Britain opened in 2000